The 2008–09 season was the 94th season in the existence of A.S. Livorno Calcio and the club's first season back in the second division of Italian football. In addition to the domestic league, Livorno participated in this season's edition of the Coppa Italia.

Pre-season and friendlies

Competitions

Overall record

Serie B

League table

Results summary

Results by round

Matches

Coppa Italia

References

U.S. Livorno 1915 seasons
Livorno